The 2023 BWF World Tour (officially known as 2023 HSBC BWF World Tour for sponsorship reasons), is the sixth season of the BWF World Tour of badminton, a circuit of 31 tournaments that lead up to the World Tour Finals tournament. The 31 tournaments are divided into five levels: Level 1 is the said World Tour Finals, Level 2 called Super 1000 (4 tournaments), Level 3 called Super 750 (6 tournaments), Level 4 called Super 500 (9 tournaments) and Level 5 called Super 300 (11 tournaments). Each of these tournaments offers different ranking points and prize money. The highest points and prize pool are offered at the Super 1000 level (including the World Tour Finals).

One other category of the tournament, the BWF Tour Super 100 (level 6), also offers BWF World Tour ranking points. It still acts as an important part of the pathway and entry point for players into the BWF World Tour tournaments. BWF announced that there will be nine tournaments for the BWF Tour Super 100 in 2023.

Results 
Below is the schedule released by the Badminton World Federation:

Key

Winners

Finals 
This is the complete schedule of events on the 2023 calendar, with the champions and runners-up documented.

January

February 
No World Tour tournaments held in February.

March

April

May

June

July

August

September

October

November

December

Statistics

Performance by countries 
Below are the 2023 BWF World Tour performances by countries. Only countries who have won a title are listed:

BWF World Tour

BWF Tour Super 100

Performance by categories 
Tables were calculated after finals of the All England Open.

Men's singles

Women's singles

Men's doubles

Women's doubles

Mixed doubles

World Tour Rankings
The points are calculated from the following levels:
BWF World Tour Super 1000,
BWF World Tour Super 750, 
BWF World Tour Super 500, 
BWF World Tour Super 300,
BWF Tour Super 100.

Information on Points, Won, Lost, and % columns were calculated after the 2023 Indonesia Masters.
Key

Men's singles 
The table below was based on the ranking of men's singles as of 7 February 2023.

Women's singles 
The table below was based on the ranking of women's singles as of 7 February 2023.

Men's doubles 
The table below was based on the ranking of men's doubles as of 7 February 2023.

Women's doubles 
The table below was based on the ranking of women's doubles as of 7 February 2023.

Mixed doubles 
The table below was based on the ranking of mixed doubles as of 7 February 2023.

References

Notes 

 
World Tour
BWF World Tour
BWF